Isabelle Fuhrman (born February 25, 1997) is an American actress. She is known for her role as Esther in the horror film Orphan (2009) and its prequel Orphan: First Kill (2022). She also portrayed Clove in the dystopian adventure film The Hunger Games (2012), and Alex in the independent film The Novice (2021).

Early life 
Fuhrman was born in Washington, D.C., the daughter of Elina Fuhrman ( Kozmits), a journalist, author, wellness activist, and founder of the vegan soup company Soupelina, and Nick Fuhrman, a one-time Wisconsin political primary candidate for U.S. House of Representatives, and business consultant. Her father, who is of Irish descent, was adopted by a Jewish family. Her mother is a Russian Jewish immigrant from Soviet Moldova. Isabelle Fuhrman has an older sister who was born in 1993. She and her family moved to Atlanta in 1999 when her mother joined CNN. She attended the Buckley School, a private school in Sherman Oaks for high school. Fuhrman also briefly attended the RADA, and briefly was a student at The Westminster Schools in Atlanta. She graduated from Stanford University Online High School in 2015.

Career 
Fuhrman's acting career began at age seven, when a casting director from Cartoon Network spotted her while she was waiting for her older sister Madeline and cast her for one of the shows, Cartoon Fridays. Her early credits include Grace O'Neil in the pilot episode of the 2006 television series Justice, and a number of national commercials for such brands as Pizza Hut and K-Mart. In 2007, she made her film debut in the controversial drama feature Hounddog.

Fuhrman's performance as Gretchen Dennis (also known as Girl Ghost) opposite Jennifer Love Hewitt in a 2008 episode of Ghost Whisperer earned her a Young Artist Award nomination. Also in 2008, Fuhrman was cast in the movie Orphan alongside Vera Farmiga and Peter Sarsgaard following an exhaustive nationwide search of young actresses to portray the lead in the three-way collaboration between Warner Bros., Appian Way Productions, and Dark Castle Entertainment. It was released in 2009 to commercial success and Fuhrman's acting was praised. She also appeared in comedy skits on The Tonight Show with Jay Leno.

In 2011, Fuhrman played Angie Vanderveer in the dark comedy Salvation Boulevard (based on the novel by Larry Beinhart), with an ensemble cast that included Pierce Brosnan and Marisa Tomei. It premiered at the Sundance Film Festival.

In 2012, Fuhrman voiced the genetically enhanced assassin Victoria in Hitman: Absolution. In the same year she played Clove, a career tribute who tries to kill the main character, Katniss, in the film The Hunger Games. She originally auditioned to play Katniss, but was too young to play the part; she was 14 at the time. She received a call-back to audition for Clove and got the part. On May 15, 2012, it was announced that Fuhrman would star in the remake of the 1977 horror classic Suspiria, however it was later announced that the production was stuck in legal woes and that the film would not be made.

On May 24, 2013, Fuhrman was cast as Max in Dear Eleanor (2016), directed by Kevin Connolly. In 2014, Fuhrman was cast in the film Cell, an adaptation by Stephen King. In 2015, she was cast in a "major recurring role" on the Showtime drama series Masters of Sex, playing Tessa, the daughter of Virginia Johnson (Lizzy Caplan). Fuhrman was also cast as the lead in the independent drama Hellbent.

In 2021, Fuhrman starred as Alex in Lauren Hadaway's directorial debut The Novice. Her performance gained critical praise, with critics calling Fuhrman's turn "a Daniel Day-Lewis transformation" and "the year's best performance". For The Novice, she won the Tribeca Film Festival Award for Best Actress, and was nominated for the Independent Spirit Award for Best Female Lead. It was announced in 2020 that Fuhrman would reprise her role as Esther in an Orphan prequel; the film, titled Orphan: First Kill, was released in August 2022, with Fuhrman's performance again being lauded.

In September 2022, Fuhrman joined the cast of the Kevin Costner-directed western film Horizon and Face, a film directed by Justine Bateman.

Charitable work 
Fuhrman was approached by Save the Children in 2010, to be a celebrity advocate for their "Caps for Good" project. She and several volunteers with Save the Children have helped knit hundreds of baby caps in an effort to reduce the death rate of newborns in developing countries. Fuhrman is on the advisory board of the Love & Art Kids Foundation, a Los Angeles based non-profit organization.

Filmography

Film

Television

Video games

Stage

Awards and nominations

References

External links 

 
 
 
 Isabelle Fuhrman on Facebook

1997 births
Living people
21st-century American actresses
21st-century American Jews
Actresses from Washington, D.C.
American child actresses
American film actresses
American people of Russian-Jewish descent
American people of Moldovan-Jewish descent
American television actresses
American video game actresses
American voice actresses
Jewish American actresses
People from Studio City, Los Angeles